Where were you, Odysseus? is a 1978 Soviet three-part television war film directed by Timur Zoloyev.

The film is based on the story of Alexei Azarov's The Road to Zeus, about the actions of Soviet intelligence during the Great Patriotic War.

Plot
1944 year. The Soviet intelligence officer, who acts under the name of the French businessman Auguste Ptigan, accidentally gets into the ranks of Gestapo; who take him for an English spy.

Because of this, the scout gets the opportunity to establish contacts with high ranks of the Gestapo and the Abwehr who understand the inevitability of the defeat of Hitler's army and try to establish contact with the intelligence services of the countries that are part of the anti-Hitler coalition ...

Cast
Donatas Banionis — Soviet intelligence officer Odyssey (also Ptizhan and Lehman)
Anatoli Romashin — SS Sturmbannführer Karl Ehrlich
Irina Tereshchenko — Shafrhurer SS Lotta Bolz
Georgy Drozd — Oberscharfuhrer SS Vogel
Lev Perfilov — Doctor Gauk
Karlis Sebris — Standartenfuhrer SS (Gestapo) Zoller
Victor Malyarevich — Soviet radio operator Luke
Erwin Knausmüller — von Arvid
Peter Kudlai — Standartenfuhrer SS
Alexander Lazarev — Brigadefuhrer SS Count von Warburg Trottenvalz

References

External links

Soviet television films
Odesa Film Studio films
World War II spy films
Soviet war films
1970s war films
Soviet World War II films
Ukrainian World War II films
Soviet-era Ukrainian films